Lucas Paulos (born 9 January 1998) is an Argentine rugby union player who plays for the Jaguares. On 28 December 2018, Vivas was named in the Jaguares squad for the 2019 Super Rugby season. His playing position is Lock. He started playing in the División de Honor B team Club de Rugby Majadahonda.

References

External links
 itsrugby Profile

Jaguares (Super Rugby) players
Rugby union locks
Argentine rugby union players
Rugby union players from Buenos Aires
1998 births
Living people